Mathew Cerletty (born 1980, Wauwatosa, Wisconsin) is an artist who lives and works in New York City.

Cerletty studied at Boston University College of Fine Arts graduating with a BFA in 2002.

His work has been exhibited at galleries and museums including Whitney Museum of American Art and the Hermitage Museum in St. Petersburg, and the Museum of Contemporary Art in San Diego. He is represented by Office Baroque in Brussels, Belgium and Standard in Oslo, Norway.

In a 2008 article in the magazine Interview, Christopher Bollen described Cerletty as an artist who "could have remained his generation's premier portrait artist." Since then his practice has expanded to include text, patterned abstraction, landscape, and many other genres of painting.

He uses a variety of painting styles, most notably hyper-realistic precision, to bring significance to ordinary and unexpected subjects–from corporate logos, to cinder block walls, to Ikea furniture. In the vein of surrealists like René Magritte, his paintings present the familiar as peculiar. Although Cerletty approaches his images with a tongue-in-cheek humor, there is an underlying sincerity in his attention to detail.

References

External links
 mathewcerletty.com
 Office Baroque: Mathew Cerletty

1980 births
Living people
Artists from Wisconsin
Artists from New York (state)
American contemporary artists
Boston University College of Fine Arts alumni
People from Wauwatosa, Wisconsin